TSS (RMS) Tynwald (V), No. 165248, was a passenger vessel operated by the Isle of Man Steam Packet Company from 1947 to 1974, and was the fifth vessel in the history of the line to bear the name.

History
Tynwald was built by Cammell Laird at Birkenhead in 1947, at a cost of £461,859 (equivalent to £ in ).

The third of the six sisters, Tynwald was virtually identical to her two predecessors  and  except for her tonnage, which was 2490.

Incidents
There was one accident in her history when she sank the barge Elanor in the Mersey on 25 February 1952.

Service life and disposal
She was popular and considered to have done a very sound job for the Company, and she continued to give service until 1974 when she was withdrawn from the fleet in August. By this time, the newer car ferries in the company were taking the bulk of the passenger traffic, and therefore it was viable to reduce the number of passenger vessels from seven to six.

Tynwald was sold to John Cashmore of Newport, Mons. for £57,000 (equivalent to £ in ), and resold to Spanish breakers who demolished her at Avtles in February 1975.

Her ship's whistle was retained by the Company, and to the delight of lovers of Manx ships, was fitted to the car ferry  during her winter overhaul in 1978.

References

Bibliography

 Chappell, Connery (1980). Island Lifeline T.Stephenson & Sons Ltd 

1947 ships
Ships of the Isle of Man Steam Packet Company
Passenger ships of the United Kingdom
Ferries of the Isle of Man
Steamships
Ships built on the River Mersey
Maritime incidents in 1952
Steamships of the United Kingdom
Merchant ships of the United Kingdom